William David Thoms (March 5, 1910 – December 26, 1964) was a Canadian professional ice hockey player who played 548 games in the National Hockey League for the Toronto Maple Leafs, Chicago Black Hawks and Boston Bruins between 1932 and 1945.

Thoms tied Charlie Conacher for the NHL goal-scoring lead in 1935–36; however, Conacher is recognized as the goal-scoring champion due to Conacher's playing fewer games. After his retirement in 1945, Thoms briefly coached the Toronto Marlboros of the Ontario Hockey Association, and died of a heart attack on December 26, 1964.

Career statistics

Regular season and playoffs

External links
 
 

1910 births
1964 deaths
Boston Bruins players
Canadian ice hockey centres
Canadian ice hockey coaches
Chicago Blackhawks players
Ice hockey people from Ontario
Ontario Hockey Association Senior A League (1890–1979) players
Sportspeople from Newmarket, Ontario
Syracuse Stars (IHL) players
Toronto Maple Leafs players
Toronto Marlboros coaches